Major-General Sir Reginald Salmond Curtis  (21 November 1863 – 11 January 1922) was a British army officer, responsible for the reorganisation and modernisation of the Royal Engineers during the First World War.

Early life
He was the eldest son of Major-General Reginald Curtis, Royal Artillery and Marianne Emma Salmond, and was educated at Cheltenham College and the Royal Military Academy, Woolwich. He received his first commission in 1883.

Career in Africa
From 1890 to 1893 he served in the Egyptian Army, and was present at the capture of Tokar, in the Sudan campaign of 1891. In the Ashanti expedition of 1895-6 he served as Director of Telegraphs.

The Second Boer War broke out in South Africa in October 1899. Curtis was at first ADC to the Engineer-in-Chief, and was afterwards appointed Assistant Director of Telegraphs. He was involved in military operations in the Orange Free State from February to May, 1900, including the battles of Paardeberg and Driefontein, and operations at Vet River, and Zand River. He served in the Transvaal in May and June, 1900, in actions near Johannesburg and Pretoria, then east of Pretoria from July to October, 1900, including the action at Belfast, also in Cape Colony south of the Orange River. For his service with the paramilitary South African Constabulary during the later part of the war, he received a brevet promotion to lieutenant-colonel on 22 August 1902.

After the end of the war in June 1902, he remained in South Africa and was promoted to the substantive rank of lieutenant-colonel, staying there until 1908 as Chief Staff Officer, and then Inspector-General of the South African Constabulary. He was a member of the Inter-Colonial Council of the Transvaal and Orange River Colony.

First World War
After returning to Britain, he was posted to Edinburgh and Aldershot before becoming Commandant of the Royal School of Signals in 1912-13. However, when the First World War broke out Curtis was Assistant Adjutant General at the War Office, where he remained until 1917.

Curtis's fellow officer, Major General Sir George Kenneth Scott-Moncrieff, explained the importance of Curtis's work in a letter to The Times newspaper, dated 16 January 1922:
At the outbreak of war in 1914  . . . the Royal Engineers . . . consisted of 1,831 officers and 24,172 other ranks.   At the conclusion of the war the numbers were 17,711 officers and 322,739 other ranks.   This enormous increase was not merely a multiplication of existing organizations, but the creation of a vast number of new branches of the Engineers' arm, of a nature previously unforeseen, to suit the advance of science applied to war. Besides the field and fortress and railway companies, with signaling units and field squadrons and bridging trains which had formerly been employed, there were electrical and mechanical companies, tunnelling companies for mining, water supply units, field survey battalions, and sound ranging and observation companies. There were units for land drainage and for inundations. there were sections for field and anti-aircraft searchlights. There were others for forestry, camouflage, meteorology, chemical warfare, and a large number of units for transportation by land and water, such as road and railway companies of many kinds and inland water transport. The raising and organizing of all these units,with their varying requirements and their special officers, was a gigantic task. General Curtis had to work, day after day, in a dark and ill-ventilated room at the war office, and his strength, already weakened by years of valuable service in Africa, was strained beyond recovery.   But the units he raised were a notable contribution to the success of the operations . . .

In 1917, he was appointed to command the Cromarty naval base defences, before taking charge of administration at Aldershot.  He retired in 1920, when he was promoted to Major-General and received a knighthood.

Family
Curtis married the Hon. Hilda Margaret, daughter of Viscount Barrington in 1894, and they had three daughters.

References

British Army generals of World War I
Royal Engineers officers
1863 births
1922 deaths
Knights Commander of the Order of the Bath
Knights Commander of the Order of St Michael and St George
British Army major generals
Graduates of the Royal Military Academy, Woolwich
People educated at Cheltenham College
British Army personnel of the Second Boer War
British military personnel of the Fourth Anglo-Ashanti War